Omaha Rapid Bus Transit (ORBT) is a bus rapid transit service in Omaha, Nebraska, United States. It is operated by Metro Transit and serves the central corridor of Dodge Street between Omaha's Old Market entertainment district and Westroads Mall. Construction began begin in late 2018, with full service beginning in the fall of 2020. The system uses  articulated buses powered by compressed natural gas. The route features dedicated lanes, signal priority for ORBT vehicles, and a park and ride lot at Westroads Mall.

History
Planning for a bus rapid transit system in Omaha was listed as a priority by Regional Transit Vision as early as 2013.  Work began after a $15 million TIGER grant was awarded to Omaha by the Federal Transit Administration.  Metro Transit unveiled the ORBT brand in August 2017. Construction commenced in late 2018 and ORBT service began in fall 2020.

Route
The route runs east–west along Dodge Street. ORBT's twenty three stops are between four and twelve blocks apart, further apart than most Metro Transit bus routes.  Westbound stops include 12th & Dodge, 15th & Dodge, 20th & Dodge, 24th & Dodge, Park Ave & Dodge, 33rd & Dodge, 42nd & Dodge, 49th & Dodge, 62nd & Dodge, 72nd & Dodge, 77th & Dodge, 84th & Dodge, 90th & Dodge, and 102nd & Nicholas. Eastbound stops include 102nd & Nicholas, 90th & Dodge, 84th & Dodge, 77th & Dodge, 72nd & Dodge, 62nd & Dodge, 49th & Dodge, 42nd & Dodge, 33rd & Dodge, Park Ave & Douglas, 24th & Douglas, 19th & Douglas, 15th & Douglas, and 10th & Douglas. Points of interest along the route include the Old Market District, Nebraska Medicine, the University of Nebraska Omaha, and The Joslyn Museum. The eastern terminus is at 10th Street in the Old Market. The western terminus is located at the Westroads Transit Center and include a Park & Ride Lot.

Expansion
Metro Transit has explored possible expansion of ORBT further west along Dodge Street, along Broadway into Council Bluffs, and both north and south along 10th and 72nd streets.

Design
The ORBT system uses New Flyer Xcelsior bused powered by CNG. Buses used on ORBT are longer than typical Metro Transit buses and feature on-board bicycle racks and free Wi-Fi. They also feature accessibility features including level boarding and navigation aids. The first vehicle was displayed to the press in 2017.

Stations include fully covered platforms, with floors of conductive concrete for better grip during winter months. Each station has a ticketing kiosk, arrival signage, free WiFi, and bike racks. Select stations also have B-Cycle bicycle sharing.

References

External links 
 
 ORBT Frequently Asked Questions

Bus rapid transit in the United States
Transportation in Omaha, Nebraska